Jaws of Steel is a 1927 American silent family adventure film directed by Ray Enright and featuring dog star Rin Tin Tin and Jason Robards, Sr. Warner Bros. produced and distributed the film. Darryl Zanuck, under the alias Gregory Rogers, wrote the story.

Cast
Rin Tin Tin as Rinty
Jason Robards, Sr. as John Warren
Helen Ferguson as Mary Warren
Mary Louise Miller as Baby Warren
Jack Curtis as Thoms Grant Taylor
Bob Perry as The Sheriff
Buck Connors as Alkali Joe

Box office
According to Warner Bros records the film earned $189,000 domestic and $83,000 foreign.

See also
List of early Warner Bros. sound and talking features

Preservation status

A nitrate print of the film is archived by Filmmuseum Nederlands. The Library of Congress has a copy shown to the public in the 1990s but is incomplete missing a reel.

References

External links

Still #1 and #2 at gettyimages.com

1927 films
American silent feature films
Warner Bros. films
Films directed by Ray Enright
American black-and-white films
Transitional sound films
American adventure films
1927 adventure films
Rin Tin Tin
1920s American films
Silent adventure films
1920s English-language films